is a Japanese film director. His film First Love was the 3rd Best Film at the 22nd Yokohama Film Festival.

Filmography
 Running High (1989)
 Work on the Grass (1993)
 One More Time, One More Chance (1996)
 Aku no hana (1997)
 Sentakuki wa ore ni makasero (1999)
 Kimi no tame ni dekiru koto (1999)
 First Love (2000)
 Stake Out (2001)
 Inochi (2002)
 High School Girl's Friend (2002)
 Mokuyo kumikyoku (2002)
 Jam Films "Kendama" (2002)
 Karaoke Terror (2004)
 Heaven's Bookstore (2004)
 Breathe In, Breathe Out (2004)
 Female (2005)
 Yokubō (2005)
 Metro ni Notte (2006)
 Clearless (2007)
 Manatsu no Orion (2009)
 Ogawa no Hotori (2011)
 Sweet Heart Chocolate (2013)
 Tanemaku tabibito: Kuni umi no sato (2015)
 Kishūteneki Terminal (2015)
 Flower and Sword (2017)
 Shadowfall (2019)
 Iyashi no Kokoromi (2020)
 Inubu: The Dog Club (2021)

References

External links

1962 births
Living people
Japanese film directors
People from Tokyo